Herschel Leroy Blunt (December 3, 1921 – March 21, 2016) was an American farmer and politician who served in the Missouri House of Representatives.

Blunt was born near Marshfield, Missouri in Webster County, the son of Bessie J. (Muncy) and Benjamin Lee Blunt. He attended public schools in Conway, Missouri, and the University of Missouri. In 1942 he married Neva Letterman. He served in the Missouri House of Representatives for district 140 as a Republican from 1979 to 1986. He was the father of U.S. Senator from Missouri and former U.S. Representative Roy Blunt. Roy's son, Matt Blunt, is a former Governor of Missouri. In his first race in 1978, he beat out Betty Anne McCaskill, mother of future Senator Claire McCaskill, who would later unsuccessfully run against Matt Blunt in the 2004 gubernatorial election, and serve with Roy in Senate from 2011 to 2019. He lived on a farm near Marshfield, Missouri. Blunt died on March 21, 2016, at Marshfield Care Center in Marshfield, Missouri.

References

1921 births
2016 deaths
Republican Party members of the Missouri House of Representatives
People from Marshfield, Missouri
University of Missouri alumni
Farmers from Missouri
Blunt family